Hypochaeris glabra is a species of flowering plant in the tribe Cichorieae within the family Asteraceae known by the common name smooth cat's ear. It is native to Europe, North Africa, and the Middle East but it can be found on other continents where it is an introduced species and a widespread weed. It has become widespread in Africa, southern and southeastern Asia, Australia, and parts of the Americas (especially California).

Atop the thin, naked stems are flower heads with small overlapping purple-tipped phyllaries and bright yellow ray florets.

References

External links
Jepson Manual Treatment, University of California
 C.Michael Hogan ed. 2010. “Hypochaeris glabra”. Encyclopedia of Life
United States Department of Agriculture Plants Profile
Calphotos Photo gallery, University of California
photo of herbarium specimen at Missouri Botanical Garden

glabra
Plants described in 1753
Taxa named by Carl Linnaeus
Flora of Europe